Choi Moo-ryong (February 25, 1928 – November 11, 1999) was a South Korean actor, producer, and director who is father of Choi Min-soo

Biography
Choi was born in Paju, Gyeonggi province, Korea. Choi was one of popular actors of the 1960s along with Shin Young-kyun and Kim Jin-kyu. Choi gained a popularity for his handsome appearance and masculine image. Choi's personal life was as much dramatic as his starred films, so he always garnered the public attention. 1952, Choi married a colleague actress, Kang Hyo-shil, the daughter of a noted actress, Jeon Ok with the nickname, "Queen of Tears" and a singer Gang Hong-sik. Choi and his wife had one son and four daughters including an actor, Choi Min-soo. However, Choi had an affair with Kim Ji-mee, the best popular actress at that time, so that Choi and Gang divorced in 1962. Choi soon married Kim Ji-mee, but he owed massive debts due to his failed film production. As a result, Choi chose to divorce Kim again in 1969. At that time, the phrase, Because I love you, I have to part from her was circulated among the public.

Filmography
*Note; the whole list is referenced.

Awards
*Note; the whole list is referenced.
 1963, the 1st Blue Dragon Film Awards : Special Award: Group Acting (돌아오지 않는 해병)
 1964, the 2nd Blue Dragon Film Awards : Best Supporting Actor (Red Scarf (빨간 마후라))
 1971, the 10th Grand Bell Awards : Best Supporting Actor (마지막 황태자 영친왕)
 1971, the 7th Baeksang Arts Awards : Best Film Actor (방에 불을 꺼주오)
 1971, the 8th Blue Dragon Film Awards : Best Actor (30년만의 대결)
 1972, the 9th Blue Dragon Film Awards : Favorite Actor
 1973, the 9th Baeksang Arts Awards : Favorite Film Actor selected by readers
 1973, the 10th Blue Dragon Film Awards : Favorite Actor
 1974, the 10th Baeksang Arts Awards : Favorite Film Actor selected by readers
 1999, the 36th Grand Bell Awards : Film Development Lifetime Achievement
 2000, the 4th Puchon International Fantastic Film Festival : Lifetime Achievement

References

External links 

1928 births
1999 deaths
People from Gwangju, Gyeonggi
South Korean film directors
South Korean male film actors
20th-century South Korean male actors
Members of the National Assembly (South Korea)